Sam. can refer to:
 Samvat
 Books of Samuel